Zitsa is a village and a municipality in the Ioannina regional unit, Epirus, Greece. The seat of the municipality is the village Eleousa. The municipality has an area of 565.566 km2, the municipal unit 65.868 km2, the community 29.169 km2.

Municipality
The present municipality Zitsa was formed at the 2011 local government reform by the merger of the following 5 former municipalities, that became municipal units (constituent communities in brackets):
Ekali (Asfaka, Vatatades, Vlachatano, Gavrisioi, Ligopsa, Metamorfosi, Petsali)
Evrymenes (Delvinakopoulo, Klimatia, Kokkinochoma, Lefkothea, Paliouri, Raiko, Soulopoulo, Vasilopoulo)
Molossoi (Aetopetra, Chinka, Despotiko, Dovla, Ekklisochori, Foteino, Giourganista, Granitsa, Granitsopoula, Grimpovo, Kalochori, Kourenta, Polydoro, Radovizi, Rizo, Vereniki, Voutsaras, Vrosina, Vrysoula, Zalongo)
Pasaronas (Agios Ioannis, Anargyroi, Ano Lapsista, Eleousa, Grammeno, Kato Lapsista, Lofiskos, Lyngos, Mega Gardiki, Neochori, Peratis, Petralona, Polylofo, Rodotopi, Vageniti, Vounoplagia, Zoodochos)
Zitsa (Dafnofyto, Karitsa, Lithino, Protopappas, Zitsa)

Notable people 
Patriarch Jeremias I of Constantinople (died 1546)
Dimitrios Zitsaios, benefactor
Chrysanthi Zitsaia (1903–1995), writer
Chronis Vagios (nom de guerre: Achilleas Petritis), ELAS and DSE officer.
Giannis Kapsalis, popular folk singer.

Landmarks
Theogefyro

References

Wine regions of Greece
Populated places in Ioannina (regional unit)
Municipalities of Epirus (region)